Stevan Jovetić (born 2 November 1989) is a Montenegrin professional footballer who plays as a striker for Bundesliga club Hertha BSC and captains the Montenegro national team.

Jovetić's primary position is a second striker, although he can also operate as an attacking midfielder or a winger. He is known for his dribbling, technical ability, and creativity, and his playing style has led to comparisons with Roberto Baggio.

Jovetić began his career with FK Partizan, winning the double of Serbian Superliga and Serbian Cup in 2008, then joined ACF Fiorentina for an approximate €10.8 million. In five seasons at the Italian club, he scored 40 times in 134 matches, prompting an approximate €26.7 million transfer to Manchester City. In his first season in England, he won the League Cup and the Premier League. He subsequently returned to Italy to play for Inter Milan in 2015, and also had a loan spell in Spain with Sevilla in 2017, before joining Ligue 1 club Monaco later that year.

Jovetić is a Montenegro international, having previously represented his team at under-21 level. He made his senior international debut in 2007, in Montenegro's first international football match as an independent country. With 31 goals, he is Montenegro's all-time top goalscorer.

Club career
Jovetic made his first football steps at Mladost Podgorica. He played for them until 2004 when he joined FK Partizan.

Partizan
On 9 April 2006, at the age of 16, Jovetić made his senior debut for FK Partizan under head coach Jürgen Röber during a league match against FK Voždovac.

He scored three goals during a UEFA Cup qualifying game against Zrinjski on 2 August 2007, in a 5–0 victory for Partizan, recording his first career hat-trick at only 17 years old. He became Partizan's club captain aged 17 years, 10 months and 21 days in January 2008, after former captain Antonio Rukavina was sold to German Bundesliga side Borussia Dortmund. This made him Partizan's youngest captain ever, surpassing Albert Nađ, who became captain at age 19. Jovetić held the record until 31 October 2012 when he was surpassed by Nikola Ninković.

Fiorentina
On 10 May 2008, Serie A club Fiorentina signed him for a fee of approx. €10.8 million. He scored his first goal for La Viola in the league match against Atalanta from the penalty spot on 5 April 2009.

He started the 2009–10 season with a goal against Sporting Clube de Portugal in a 1–1 return leg draw at Stadio Artemio Franchi, which gave Fiorentina their entrance into the Champions League group stages. Other decisive goals included goals against Palermo, Sampdoria, and Livorno. On 29 September 2009, he scored both goals in a 2–0 victory over Liverpool in the Champions League group stage. On 9 March 2010, Jovetić scored two goals in Fiorentina's 3–2 win over Bayern Munich. The club lost, however, on away goals, and he also scored again against Napoli on 13 March. He scored in a 4–1 win against Udinese on 28 March.

During pre-season training for the 2010–11 season, he suffered an injury to his cruciate ligament in his right knee which eventually saw him out for the whole season.

Jovetić returned from injury in fine form in the 2011–12 season, scoring a double in a 3–0 win against Parma, his first goals in over a year. On 15 October 2011, Jovetić signed a contract that would keep him in Florence through 2016.  Following the winter break in the Serie A, Jovetić netted twice as Fiorentina eased to a comfortable 3–0 victory over Novara on 8 January 2012. A month later, on 5 February, Jovetić earned his side a 3–2 victory against Udinese by converting two penalties; the win gave Fiorentina back-to-back victories in the Serie A for the first time all season. He failed to find the back of the net after this game for over two months before netting his side's opener and then assisting the winning goal for Amauri as Fiorentina shocked title contenders Milan 2–1 on 7 April. Jovetić netted 14 times in 27 league games for Fiorentina, as the Tuscan side limped to 13th place in Serie A.

On 17 February 2013, both Jovetić and teammate Adem Ljajić netted braces as Fiorentina thrashed Inter 4–1 at the Stadio Artemio Franchi.

Manchester City
On 19 July 2013, he signed for Premier League club Manchester City in a deal worth approx. €26.7 million. Upon signing for the club, Jovetić chose to wear number 35 on his shirt, which he also wore while playing for Partizan. He joined former Fiorentina teammate and close friend, Matija Nastasić at the club. He made his debut for Manchester City on 14 September, in a 0–0 draw away against Stoke City. He scored his first goals for the club on 24 September, in a 5–0 win against Wigan Athletic in the League Cup.

On 29 January 2014, Jovetić scored his first Premier League goal in a 5–1 win against Tottenham Hotspur at White Hart Lane. On 15 February, he scored his first FA Cup goal in a 2–0 victory over Chelsea in the fifth round. On 5 April, he scored his second goal in the Premier League in a 4–1 win over Southampton. On 7 May 2014, he scored his first league goal at the City of Manchester Stadium in Manchester City's 4–0 win over Aston Villa.

On 25 August 2014, he scored two goals in Manchester City's 3–1 home win over Liverpool. Upon missing time with injury, in February 2015, sanctions imposed by UEFA on City resulted in him being dropped from their UEFA Champions League squad and replaced by new signing Wilfried Bony. Jovetić reacted by saying "The manager has killed me with this decision" and questioned his future at the club.

Internazionale 
In 2015 summer he returned to Italy, signing for Inter Milan on an 18-month loan, for €2.5 million fee, with a conditional obligation of redemption for €14.5 million, if Inter was ranked 17th or better in December 2016 or making an appearance for Inter in 2016–17 season. In his first 2 appearances, he scored 3 goals, with Inter winning both games. He went through a goal drought, which was broken against Udinese. Jovetić scored a brace against Udinese.

The conditional obligation to buy Jovetić was activated in July 2016.

For 2016–17 season, he was cut from the squad available for Europa League. De Boer and Pioli gave him 5 appearances.

Loan to Sevilla
On 10 January 2017, he signed a loan deal with Spanish team Sevilla until the end of season. He made his debut with the club on 12 January, scoring a goal in a 3–3 draw against Real Madrid in the Copa del Rey. He scored once again against Real Madrid three days later, this time in the league, coming on as a late substitute for Franco Vázquez, and securing the three points in stoppage time with the match-winning goal that put Sevilla back in second place in La Liga, and ended Real Madrid's 40-game-long unbeaten run in all competitions.

AS Monaco
On 29 August 2017, Monaco announced the signing of Jovetić on a four-year contract. After the departure of Kylian Mbappé on 31 August, Jovetić was assigned number 10 shirt. In his first season with Monaco he scored 10 goals in 21 matches in all competitions, averaging just above 50 minutes per game. During that season between 10 February and 16 March 2018 he had a streak of 5 consecutive matches with goals scored, among them the only brace (two goals in a single game) of the season against Angers SCO.

Hertha BSC
On 27 July 2021, Jovetić signed for Hertha BSC on a two-year contract. Becoming the third player (after Florin Răducioiu and Christian Poulsen) in history to play in all five of the big leagues (Germany, Spain, Italy, England and France). When he scored against 1. FC Köln on 14 August 2021, he became the second player, after Florin Răducioiu, to score at least one league goal in Europe's top five leagues.

International career

Serbia and Montenegro
Jovetić was part of the Serbia and Montenegro squad at the 2006 UEFA European Under-17 Championship. The team was eliminated in the group stage.

Montenegro

Jovetić was a founding member of the Montenegro national team which played their first game against Hungary in March 2007, and was also a regular for the Montenegro U-21 team. Jovetić scored his first international goal against the same team, netting twice in a 3–3 friendly draw with Hungary on 20 August 2008 at the Puskás Ferenc Stadion in Budapest. He scored another brace on 29 February 2012 in his first match as captain when regular skipper Mirko Vučinić began on the bench, a 2–1 friendly home victory over Iceland.

On 15 October 2013 in a qualifier for the next year's World Cup, Jovetić scored his first competitive international brace, with an equalising penalty and an added-time goal at the Podgorica City Stadium, albeit in a 2–5 defeat to Moldova.

Jovetić equalised from a penalty on 14 November 2014 to earn Montenegro a 1–1 draw against Sweden in UEFA Euro 2016 qualifying.

Style of play
A quick, strong and versatile player, Jovetić is a well-rounded forward, who is capable of playing anywhere along the front-line, and has been deployed as a main striker, as a winger, in a supporting role, or as an attacking midfielder, due to his ability to link-up with midfielders, and either score or create goals. A creative and technically gifted striker, he is also known for his dribbling skills, mobility, and pace on the ball, as well as his ability to make attacking runs towards goal from deeper positions and strike well with both feet. Despite his talent, his playing time has often been limited by several injuries. His playing style, appearance, and hairstyle led him to be compared to Roberto Baggio during his time at Fiorentina, who had also played for the club.

Personal life
Age 13, he moved from his hometown of Podgorica to Belgrade to play for FK Partizan's youth team. He stayed in Belgrade for four and a half years, and was then signed by Fiorentina (May 2008), living in Florence for 5 years until 2013, when he was signed by Manchester City.

His nickname in Montenegro is "Joveta". Fiorentina supporters gave Jovetić the nickname "Jo-Jo." His idols are former Roma forward and fellow Montenegrin international Mirko Vučinić, from whom he took the Montenegro U-21 captain's armband at the age of 17; and Andriy Shevchenko, who Jovetić emulated as a child.

He is a gamer, playing PlayStation, often with friend and former teammate Matija Nastasić. He has his left arm covered in tattoos (a "full-sleeve"). He has never consumed alcohol. His favourite team is FK Partizan. Jovetić is an Eastern Orthodox Christian.

Career statistics

Club

International

As of match played 27 March 2021. Montenegro score listed first, score column indicates score after each Jovetić goal.

Honours
Partizan
Serbian SuperLiga: 2007–08
Serbian Cup: 2007–08

Manchester City
Premier League: 2013–14

Individual
Montenegrin Footballer of the Year: 2009, 2015

References

External links

Profile at the Hertha BSC website
Official website

1989 births
Living people
Footballers from Podgorica
Eastern Orthodox Christians from Montenegro
Association football forwards
Serbia and Montenegro footballers
Montenegrin footballers
Montenegro youth international footballers
Montenegro under-21 international footballers
Montenegro international footballers
FK Partizan players
ACF Fiorentina players
Manchester City F.C. players
Inter Milan players
Sevilla FC players
AS Monaco FC players
Hertha BSC players
First League of Serbia and Montenegro players
Serbian SuperLiga players
Serie A players
Premier League players
La Liga players
Ligue 1 players
Bundesliga players
Montenegrin expatriate footballers
Expatriate footballers in Italy
Montenegrin expatriate sportspeople in Italy
Expatriate footballers in England
Montenegrin expatriate sportspeople in England
Expatriate footballers in Monaco
Expatriate footballers in Germany